Aloe carnea,  is a species of Aloe found in Eastern Zimbabwe to Western Mozambique.

References

External links
 
 

carnea